Millennium Skate Park, also known as Owl's Head Skate Park, is a skate park in Bay Ridge, Brooklyn, located in Owl's Head Park, adjacent to the Sunset Park Greenway.

History 
The park opened in 2001, designed by pro-skater Andy Kessler, it was the first concrete skatepark built in Brooklyn. The skate park was funded entirely by City Council Member Marty Golden and implemented by the NYC Parks' Capital Projects Division. Golden worked with Julius Spiegel, Martin Maher, and Laurence Major, Jr. to find a location in the park and bring it to fruition. The city worked with the skateboarding community to design the park. Owl's Head was the first concrete skatepark in New York City built by the Parks Department through the capital process.

This park is 14,000 square feet of skate park area, including both a street section and bowl section. One of the bowls at Millennium Skate Park is eight feet deep. In 2017, the New York City parks department repaired parts of the skatepark.

Events 
In 2018, Andy Kessler Day was held at Millennium skate park. Since it was built, skaters have held many skate jams at the park. The NYC Skateboard Coalition hosts a yearly pool series event at the park.

Gallery of photos from Millennium Skate Park

References

External links 

 NYC Pool Series – Owl’s Head Skatepark (2018)

Parks in Brooklyn
Skateparks in New York City
Skateparks in the United States